Thomas Wood Bradshaw, Jr. (born 1938) is a North Carolina businessman and public official. He was a member of the city council of Raleigh, and became the youngest mayor of Raleigh, serving for one term (1971-1973). Bradshaw later served as North Carolina Secretary of Transportation during the first term of Governor Jim Hunt (1977-1981). After his time in state government, he worked as managing director and co-head of the Transportation Group for Citigroup Global Markets.

Bradshaw was a candidate for a seat in the North Carolina Senate in 2014.

See also
 List of mayors of Raleigh, North Carolina

References
Former Raleigh mayor goes to work for DOT

External links
Tom Bradshaw for NC Senate

1938 births
Mayors of Raleigh, North Carolina
Raleigh City Council members
State cabinet secretaries of North Carolina
Living people